Wazzup Wazzup was a comedic-news program which was previously aired on Philippine television network Studio 23. The show features Vhong Navarro, Toni Gonzaga, and Archie Alemania as news anchors who introduce segments that are delivered by 'tadjocks' (a pun on the Tagalog word "tadyak", which means "kick" or "to kick").

In the show's first season, the news anchors were Vhong Navarro, Toni Gonzaga and Drew Arellano.  Conflicts with Arellano's programs on rival GMA Network forced him to give up the show to focus on other programs he had with GMA.

Although no admission or comment had been released by ABS CBN, Wazzup Wazzup was notably very similar in form and concept with the popular Argentine show CQC which has been adapted and shown in five other countries.

The theme music of Wazzup Wazzup is originally based on “Whatz Up, Whatz Up” by Playa Poncho, and LA Sno.

In April 2006, Wazzup Wazzup was reformatted with the new set including a News Desk and a Stage instead of a Coffee Shop (e.g. Gloria Jean's Coffees) and/or a Juice Bar.

Wazzup Wazzup aired its last episode on July 20, 2007.

Anchors (former/new)
Vhong Navarro
Toni Gonzaga
Drew Arellano
Archie Alemania

4th anchors
Zanjoe Marudo
Makisig Morales
Sam Concepcion
Bea Alonzo
John Lloyd Cruz
Meryll Soriano
Sam Milby
Anne Curtis
Margerie Romero

TadJocks

Present TadJocks 
Niña Dolino a.k.a. Chief Tadjock
Say Alonzo a.k.a. News Bebot
Dianne Medina a.k.a. Tadjock Over Active
Eri Neeman a.k.a. Running Tadjock
Vincent Liwanag
Teddy Corpuz a.k.a. Tedjock (from Rocksteddy)

Former reporters
Drew Arellano
Jaja Bolivar as Kikiam
Mitch Hernandez as Lookah
JC Cuadrado
Ketchup Eusebio
Bianca Gonzalez
Boomboom Gonzales
Jaja Gonzales
Carla Humphries
Bianca Valerio
DJ Mike
Jay Eigenmann and James Gabrillo
Alvie Lacanlale
Sarah Christophers
Darling Lavinia
Wallace Tiktik
CJ Navato
Rey Langit

See also
 List of programs aired by Studio 23

External links
 Studio 23 website
 Studio 23's Wazzup Wazzup blog

Studio 23 original programming
Philippine comedy television series
News parodies
2000s satirical television series
2004 Philippine television series debuts
2007 Philippine television series endings